Simply Deep is the debut solo studio album by American singer Kelly Rowland. It was first released through Columbia Records and Music World Entertainment on October 22, 2002, in North America, and on February 3, 2003, in other areas. Recorded in three weeks during the hiatus of her group Destiny's Child, it established Rowland as a solo star. It includes guest appearances by Solange Knowles and Joe Budden. It was preceded by the single "Dilemma" with Nelly.

It debuted and peaked at #12 on the US Billboard 200, becoming Rowland's lowest-charting album to date, selling 77,000 copies in its first week. It eventually sold over 600,000 copies and was certified Gold by the Recording Industry Association of America (RIAA) in 2002. It also topped the UK Albums Chart. and won two trophies at the TMF Awards in the Netherlands, including Best R&B International Artist. It is Rowland's best-selling album to date with more than 2 million copies worldwide.

In late 2003, nearly a year after the album's initial release, Rowland embarked on her debut solo Simply Deeper Tour to promote the album in Europe. It started in the United Kingdom on September 13, 2003, and concluded on October 6, 2003, in Paris, France, its 17th venue.

Production and development

Background
Rowland launched her singing career with all-female R&B group Destiny's Child in the late 1990s. While recording their third studio album, Survivor, in late 2000, the band announced that members of the group would disband for a short period to produce solo albums in the coming years, which they hoped would boost interest in Destiny's Child. The idea of individual releases emanated from the group's manager, Mathew Knowles. With different types of music for each member to produce, the albums were not intended to compete on the charts as Destiny's Child's management strategically planned to stagger the release of each group member's album to maximize sales. While Michelle Williams became the first to release a debut solo album, Heart to Yours, in April 2002, Beyoncé Knowles debuted on the big screen, starring in the comedy film Austin Powers in Goldmember, and started recording her solo debut Dangerously in Love (2003). Meanwhile, Rowland collaborated with American rapper Nelly on the song "Dilemma" as a solo artist. The single originally appeared on his album Nellyville (2002), becoming a worldwide number-one hit that year, allowing her label Columbia Records to advance the release date of Simply Deep from 2003 to late 2002.

Recording
In order to capitalize on the success of "Dilemma", the singer was forced to complete the album within a month. Recording sessions for the album took place  at several recording studios, including Studio 353, The Hit Factory and Sound-on-Sound Studio in New York City, Stankonia Recording Studio in Atlanta, Audio Vision Recording Studios in Miami Beach, and The Enterprise in Burbank, Henson Recording Studios and The Record Plant in Los Angeles, Heeba Jeeba Studios in Sherman Oaks and the Real FM Sound and Nature's Finest Studios in Hollywood. Several record producers and songwriters collaborated with Rowland on the album, including Damon Elliott, Mark J. Feist, Rob Fusari, Rich Harrison, Teron Beal, Billy Mann, Damon Sharpe, and Robert "Big Bert" Smith, the latter who contributed "Love/Hate," a song co-written by fellow singer Brandy. Solange Knowles, Beyoncé's younger sister, wrote and co-produced three songs on Simply Deep.

Rowland felt pressured by high expectations due to Destiny's Child and their huge success. "It was a challenge and I did that creatively and vocally," she later revealed, "I was very nervous, but I came through with flying colors because of my family and, of course, Destiny's Child. There were days in the studio where I would run out, like, 'I'm frustrated! I don't wanna do this!' And they would calm me and tell me that everything was gonna be okay. I got through it because of them." Rowland eventually overcame her fears during the process as her newfound independence offered her an opportunity to branch out and try new things. In fact, she co-wrote three songs on the album and came up with the vocal arrangements for several tracks. Musically, the album took Rowland's solo work into an alternative R&B  sound, which she described as a "weird fusion [of] a little bit of Sade and a little bit of rock." According to Rowland it was her manager Matthew Knowles idea for her to "craft her own brand of Rock & R&B".  In an Interview with Billboard, she stated, "He's always known how much I love rock music and alternative music; He brought the idea to me and I was so excited because I never thought that I could do something like that".

Release and promotion

Simply Deep was released through Columbia Records in collaboration with Music World Music on October 28, 2002, in both the United States and Canada. The album would not be released worldwide until February 3, 2003. The album yielded three singles; "Stole," a pop rock -influenced mid-tempo track about school bullying, was released as the album's lead single. The song entered the top 20 on the majority of the charts it appeared on, reaching the top five in Australia, Ireland, New Zealand and the United Kingdom, where it remains her highest-charting solo single to date.
 The album's second single was an up-tempo track entitled "Can't Nobody". The final single, "Train on a Track", was featured on the soundtrack of the romantic comedy film Maid in Manhattan (2003).

Singles
Although "Dilemma" was not technically the lead single from the album, it was the first song on the album recorded and released before Rowland even began the process of recording the album. "Dilemma" was generally well received by critics. It was number one in ten countries, including the UK, the US and Australia, selling over 7.6 million copies worldwide also becoming Rowland's first number one single as a solo artist, her highest charting and most successful single to date and her biggest international hit. "Stole" was released as the album's lead single in October 2002, following the worldwide success of "Dilemma", it entered the top twenty on the majority of the charts it appeared on but only a moderate hit compared to its predecessor. "Can't Nobody" was released as the album's second single (3rd overall) although it widely failed to match the success of "Dilemma" or "Stole". "Train on a Track", was the final track released from the album and only entered the top twenty on the UK Singles Chart, although it was featured on the soundtrack to the romantic comedy film The Seat Filler and Maid in Manhattan.

Critical reception

Upon its release, Simply Deep received generally mixed to lukewarm reviews from most music critics. British morning newspaper The Independent gave the album a generally favorable review, writing that "on the whole the album sticks closely to the standard urban-diva formula, mixing garage twitchers with the usual billing and cooing on ballads such as "Haven't Told You". But it's all done with style and intelligence, whether she's luxuriating in the loneliness of "Everytime You Walk Out That Door" or evoking the momentum of the first flush of love in "Train on a Track"." Lisa Verrico of The Times stated "on first listen, Simply Deep does everything but live up to its title. It sounds like a shallow stroll through the poppier end of urban music [...] But give it another listen and [it] does grow on you if you’re looking for an easy-on-the-ear album. It is a pleasant listen." Joy Dunbar, writing for BBC Music, noted that while "the albums main weakness is that it tries to offer too much diversity and Kelly tries too hard to stand outside her former incarnation," it was a must-have for fans of R&B music, adding: "Simply Deep endeavours to demonstrate another side of Kelly Rowland, as a songwriter and an independent solo artist [...] The in frequent high points make this a must for your collection."

In her review for Simply Deep, Caroline Sullivan of The Guardian wrote, "Rowland is no longer a mere backing vocalist for Beyoncé Knowles. But while she undoubtedly has talent to burn, her first solo album is a mildly disappointing setting for it. A top-flight example of the American inclination toward lush but lightweight soul, it makes all the right R&B noises without engaging the emotions." She gave it three out of five stars. Sal Cinquemani of Slant dismissed the ballads on Simply Deep as "all gloppy-goo and no soul; but through it all Rowland manages to keep her cool. The album's best tracks, the light and breezy "Train on a Track" and "(Love Lives In) Strange Places," infuse the singer's lush harmonies with acoustic guitars and poetic wordplay." He especially criticized Solange Knowles' contribution to the album, noting her "icky [and] laughable lyrics" as the worst on Simply Deep which he rated two and a half out of five stars. Jon Caramanica of Entertainment Weekly commented that "Rowland, at times, seems like Destiny's adopted child, never receiving a full helping of Knowles-family adulation. Alas, her first solo project doesn't pull her out from Beyonce's shadow. She needs added star power: Her backup-singer instincts leave even the hottest songs here feeling somewhat chilly." Craig Seymour of Vibe was generally disappointed with the album, writing: "Rowland's solo album marks an attempt to further establish herself as a singular talent, but the effort is as misguided as the Nelly hookup was savvy [...] An abundance  of cheesy folk/R&B numbers make Rowland come off like Brandy fronting as India.Arie." He gave Simply Deep one and a half out of five stars.

Accolades
"Dilemma" was nominated for Best Rap/Sung Collaboration and Record of the Year at the 45th Grammy Awards (2003), winning the award for Best Rap/Sung Collaboration. During the 55th Anniversary of the Hot 100 issue of Billboard magazine, the song was ranked at number 75 on the all-time Hot 100 songs while at the end of 2009 was named the eleventh most successful song from 2000 to 2009, on the Billboard Hot 100 Songs of the Decade. "Dilemma" was accredited internationally with sixteen certifications. The song also appears on the game Karaoke Revolution Presents: American Idol.

Commercial performance

Simply Deep debuted and peaked at number twelve on the Billboard 200, the official albums chart in the United States, on November 9, 2002, selling 77,000 units in its first week of release. Simultaneously, the album also charted on the Billboard Top R&B/Hip-Hop Albums tally, reaching number three behind LL Cool J's 10 (2002) and Gerald Levert's The G Spot (2002). By the end of the year, Simply Deep was certified gold by the Recording Industry Association of America (RIAA). It went on to sell more than 600,000 copies in the US.

Released to even bigger success in international territories, in the United Kingdom, the album debuted at number-one on the UK Albums Chart on February 15, 2003, selling more than 100,000 copies in its first week. It received both a silver and a gold certification by the British Phonographic Industry (BPI) the following week, and on April 11, 2003, was certified platinum for sales of 300,000 units. Simply Deep also reached the top spot on the Irish Albums Chart and was certified gold by the Irish Recorded Music Association (IRMA). Elsewhere in Europe, the album managed to enter the top ten in Denmark and the top twenty in Germany, the Netherlands, Norway, and Switzerland. Across Oceania, it placed fifth and seventh on the Australian and the New Zealand Albums Chart, in the week of January 26, 2003, and was certified gold by both the Australian Recording Industry Association (ARIA) and the Recording Industry Association of New Zealand (RIANZ). Worldwide, the album has sold over 2.5 million copies, making it Rowland's best-selling solo album to date.

Track listing

Personnel
Credits are taken from the album's liner notes.

Managerial and imagery

 A&R – Theresa LaBarbera Whites
 Art direction – Fabiola Caceres, Ian Cuttler

 Executive producers – Mathew Knowles, Kelly Rowland
 Photography – Isabel Snyder

Performance credits

 Vocals – Kelly Rowland

 Vocal assistance – Sherrie Ford, Jeanette Olsson

Instruments

 Acoustic guitar – Billy Mann
 Cello – Kati Raitinen, Peter Tornblom
 Electric guitar – Nick Moroch
 Guitar – Romeo Antonio, Mats Berntoft, Svein H. Martinsen, Isaac Phillips, Sergio Ponzo, Stanka Simeonova

 Viola – Tonstudio Bauer, Torbjorn Helander, Mikael Sjogren
 Bass – Mark J. Feist
 Drums – Mark J. Feist
 Violin – Christian Bergqvist, Ulrika Frankmar, Jan Isaksson, Roger Johnsson, Stanka Simeonova, Stanka Simeonova, Monika Stankkoliska

Technical and production

 Engineering – Blake English, Paul Falcone, John Frye, Franny G, Jaime Sickora, Spider, Kevin Thomas
 Engineering assistance – Jun Ishizeki, Flip Osman, Daniel Milazzo
 Mastering: Tom Coyne

 Mixing: Tony Maserati, Dave Pensado, Richard Travali
 Production – Anders Barrén, Dane Deviller, Mark J. Feist, Sean Hosein, Heeba Jeeba, Steve Kipner, Faltone Moore, Jany Schella, Damon Sharpe
 Vocal production – Teron Beal, Brandy Norwood, Kelly Rowland, Tiaa Wells

Charts

Weekly charts

Year-end charts

Certifications

Release history

See also
List of UK Albums Chart number ones of the 2000s

References

External links
 
 Simply Deep at Discogs

2002 debut albums
Kelly Rowland albums
Columbia Records albums
Albums recorded at Henson Recording Studios
Alternative rock albums by American artists
Pop rock albums by American artists